Philiris hemileuca is a species of butterfly of the family Lycaenidae. It is found in the Herzog Mountains of New Guinea.

References

Butterflies described in 1930
Luciini